The Hustle Continues is the fifth solo studio album by American rapper and record producer Juicy J. It was released on November 27, 2020 via Trippy Music/eOne. It features guest appearances from Logic, 2 Chainz, ASAP Rocky, Conway the Machine, Jay Rock, Key Glock, Lil Baby, Megan Thee Stallion, NLE Choppa, Project Pat, Ty Dolla Sign, Wiz Khalifa and Young Dolph.

The album was preceded by two singles: "Gah Damn High" and "Load It Up". Music videos were released for "Gah Damn High", directed by Joe Weil, "Load It Up", directed by Edgar Daniel and Juicy J, and "1995", directed by Mike Holland and Justin Fleischer.

A deluxe track listing for the album released on June 25, 2021, with nine new tracks and an alternative, rearranged track list. The deluxe album was titled The Hustle Still Continues.

Track listing

Deluxe track listing

Charts

References

2020 albums
Juicy J albums
Albums produced by Juicy J